A fireboat or fire-float is a specialized watercraft with pumps and nozzles designed for fighting shoreline and shipboard fires. The first fireboats, dating to the late 18th century, were tugboats, retrofitted with firefighting equipment.
Older designs derived from tugboats and modern fireboats more closely resembling seafaring ships can both be found in service today. Some departments would give their multi-purpose craft the title of "fireboat" also.

They are frequently used for fighting fires on docks and shore side warehouses as they can directly attack fires in the supporting underpinnings of these structures. They also have an effectively unlimited supply of water available, pumping directly from below the hull. Fireboats can be used to assist shore-based firefighters when other water is in low supply or is unavailable, for example, due to earthquake breakage of water mains, as happened in San Francisco due to the 1989 Loma Prieta earthquake.

Some modern fireboats are capable of pumping tens of thousands of gallons of water per minute.

Fireboats are most usually seen by the public when welcoming a fleet or historical ships with a display of their water moving capabilities, throwing large arcs of water in every direction.

Occasionally fireboats are used to carry firefighters, Emergency Medical Technicians, and a physician with their equipment to islands and other boats. Some may be used as icebreakers, like the Chicago Fire Department's Victor L. Schlaeger which can break 8 to 12 inch ice.
They may also carry divers or surface water rescue workers. Passengers from ships in danger can be also transferred to various kind of rescue boats. Rescue boats may be used also for oil and chemical destruction on rivers, lakes and seas. For example, the Helsinki Rescue Department in Helsinki, Finland has different types of boats for various kind of firefighting, rescue, and oil destruction tasks.

Also hydrocopters, rigid-hulled inflatable boats, fanboats and even hovercraft and helicopters are used in fire, rescue and medical emergency situations.

Cities with fireboats are usually located on a large body of water with port facilities. Smaller fire departments lacking resources will use a rigid-hulled inflatable boat or borrow boats from local rescue agencies (EMS, Coast Guard, military).

History
The first recorded fire-float was built in 1765 for the Sun Fire Insurance Company in London. This was a manual pump in a small boat, rowed by its crew to the scene of the fire. A similar craft was built in Bristol by James Hillhouse for the Imperial Fire Insurance Office in the 1780s. All fire fighting in Bristol was carried out either by private insurance companies or the Docks Company until the formation of the Bristol Fire Brigade as a branch of the police in 1876. In New York City, a small boat with a hand-pump was used to fight marine fires as early as 1809. By the middle of the nineteenth century, self-propelled steam-fire-floats were beginning to be introduced. The FDNY leased the salvage tug John Fuller as the city's first powered fireboat in 1866. Prior to the "John Fuller", as early as the late 1700s, the FDNY used hand-pumpers mounted to barges and large rowboats. The first purpose built steam driven boats were introduced by Boston Fire Department (William F. Flanders) and FDNY (William F. Havenmeyer) in 1873 and 1875 respectively. The first European fireboat to appear in Bristol was the Fire Queen, built by Shand Mason & Co., London, in 1884 for service in the city docks. The 53 ft. (16.61 m.) long craft was equipped with a three-cylinder steam pump supplying two large hose reels; one of these was replaced with a monitor, or water cannon, in 1900. Fire Queen served until 1922.

List of famous fireboats

 Abram S. Hewitt – FDNY (New York City) (1903–1958) (retired and abandon at Witte Marine Scrapyard in Rossville, Staten Island).
 Deluge – Fireboat/Tug  (New Orleans) (retired)
 Duwamish – (Seattle) 1909 (retired)
 Edward M. Cotter – Fireboat/Icebreaker (Buffalo, New York) (active) The oldest active fireboat.
 Tacoma Fireboat No. 1 –  (Tacoma, Washington) (retired)
 Fireboat 85 - Contra Costa County Fire Protection District (California). Located in 8th Battalion, Pittsburg Marina. 
 Fire Fighter – (NYC) 1938
 Fire Fighter II – FDNY (New York City) (2010) the United States' largest fireboat (Active)
 Governor Irwin – Fireboat/Tug  (San Francisco) (1878–1909) Fireboat participated in 1906 San Francisco earthquake and fire. (retired and scrapped)
 Governor Markham – Fireboat/Tug  (San Francisco) Fireboat participated in 1906 San Francisco earthquake and fire. (retired and scrapped)
  – US Navy – Fireboat/Tug  (Pearl Harbor attack) and City of Oakland 1940–1996 (retired and under museum ship restoration)
 John Fuller – steam salvage tug (NYC) – 1866 boat had 2000GPM pump and hose. Considered first modern fireboat.
 John Kendall – (Detroit) – Steam fireboat on Detroit River 1930–1976. (retired, scrapped)
 John J. Harvey – (New York City) (1931–1959) (Temporary reinstatement 9/11/2001) (retired)(Museum ship)
 Massey Shaw – (London, England) Serving in London Fire Brigade. Dunkirk Little Ship rescuing troops during Operation Dynamo (retired)
 Phoenix – (San Francisco) (active)
 Pyronaut – moored at Bristol Harbour Railway and Industrial Museum (Bristol, England) (retired)
 Ralph J. Scott – (Los Angeles) (retired)
 Sir Alexander Grantham – (Hong Kong) (retired)
 St. Mungo (fireboat) – Glasgow/Strathclyde (retired)
 Three Forty Three – FDNY (New York City) (2009) Country's largest fireboat, twin to Fire Fighter II. (Active)
 Thomas D'Alesandro (fireboat) – Baltimore (1956-2016) (retired)
 Warner Lawrence – Los Angeles (active)
 William F. Flanders – (Boston) 1873
 William F. Havenmeyer – (NYC) 1875–1901 (retired)
 William Lyon Mackenzie – (Toronto, Ontario, Canada) (active)
 William O. Bird II – Sandusky Fire Department (Sandusky, Ohio) (active)
 USS Active / USS Lively – US Navy – Fireboat/Tug (1888–1945) Fireboat participated in 1906 San Francisco earthquake and fire. (retired and scrapped)
  – US Army / US Navy – Fireboat/Tug (1865–1922) Fireboat participated in 1906 San Francisco earthquake and fire. (retired and scrapped)
  – US Army / US Navy – Fireboat/Tug (1861) Fireboat participated in 1906 San Francisco earthquake and fire. (retired and scrapped)

Departments with fireboats

Government and military with fireboats

 Japan Coast Guard – 9; 230 patrol boats with water cannons or firefighting support systems
 United States Coast Guard
 Fire class fireboat of the Royal Canadian Navy's auxiliary fleet (2):
CFAV Firebird (YTR 561)
CFAV Firebrand (YTR 562)

See also
Fireboat Station, Tacoma, Washington
Lambeth Fire Station, London, England, with a river fireboat station
 Firefighter
 Firefighting apparatus
 Police watercraft
 Rigid-hulled inflatable boat

References

External links

 "Smoke Eaters On Water", May 1931, Popular Science detailed article about New York city fireboats of that era
 "Diesel Fire Boat Shoots Seventeen Streams" Popular Mechanics, August 1937—i.e. article on Chicago Fire Department fire boat Fred A. Busse (fireboat)
 Painting of the fireboat “The New Yorker,” 1893, in the Staten Island Historical Society Online Collections Database
 Book: "Fire - floats and fireboats" - David C Pike 
 type=Manufacturer “New type of fireboats”

 
Boat types
Boat
Port infrastructure
Ship types